Shooting Stars is a 1927 British drama film directed by Anthony Asquith and A. V. Bramble and starring Annette Benson, Brian Aherne and Wally Patch. The screenplay concerns a starlet who plots an escape to Hollywood.

Premise

At Zenith Studios, a starlet plots an escape to Hollywood with her lover and the murder of her superfluous husband.

Cast
 Annette Benson as Mae Feather 
 Brian Aherne as  Julian Gordon 
 Donald Calthrop as Andy Wilkes 
 Wally Patch as Property Man 
 David Brooks as Turner 
 Ella Daincourt as Asphodel Smythe, Journalist 
 Chili Bouchier as Winnie, Bathing Beauty 
 Tubby Phillips as Fatty 
 Ian Wilson as Reporter 
 Judd Green as Lighting Man 
 Jack Rawl as Hero

Production
It was Asquith's first film as a director. It was made at Cricklewood Studios in North London for British Instructional Films. The novelisation of the film was written by the popular novelist E. Charles Vivian.

Restoration
Shooting Stars was restored in 2015 by the British Film Institute with a new score by John Altman. The new print premiered as the Archive Gala of the 2015 London Film Festival.

References

External links
 
 

1927 films
British silent feature films
1927 drama films
Films directed by Anthony Asquith
Films directed by A. V. Bramble
British black-and-white films
Films shot at Cricklewood Studios
British drama films
Films set in London
1927 directorial debut films
1920s British films
Silent drama films
1920s English-language films